KYR or kyr refers to:
 kyr, kiloyear, a thousand years
 Kyrgyzstan, UNDP country code